Nahma may refer to:

Places:
 Nahma Township, Michigan, USA
 Nahma, Ontario, Canada

Ships named USS Nahma
USS Nahma (YFB-1)
USS Nahma (SP-771)